Persea ruizii is a species of plant in the family Lauraceae. It is endemic to Peru.

References

ruizii
Vulnerable plants
Trees of Peru
Taxonomy articles created by Polbot